The ethnic cleansing of Georgians in Abkhazia, also known in Georgia as the genocide of Georgians in Abkhazia, refers to the ethnic cleansing, massacres, and forced mass expulsion of thousands of ethnic Georgians living in Abkhazia during the Georgian-Abkhaz conflict of 1992–1993 and 1998 at the hands of Abkhaz separatists and their allies. Armenians, Greeks, Russians, and opposing Abkhazians were also killed. 

In 2007, 267,345 Georgian civilians were registered as internally displaced persons (IDPs).
The ethnic cleansing and massacres of Georgians have been officially recognized by Organization for Security and Co-operation in Europe (OSCE) conventions in 1994, 1996, and again in 1997 during the Budapest, Lisbon, and Istanbul summits, which condemned the "perpetrators of war crimes committed during the conflict." 

On May 15, 2008, the United Nations General Assembly adopted (by 14 votes to 11, with 105 abstentions) a resolution A/RES/62/249, which "Emphasizes the importance of preserving the property rights of refugees and internally displaced persons from Abkhazia, Georgia, including victims of reported "ethnic cleansing," and calls upon all the Member States to deter persons under their jurisdiction from obtaining property within the territory of Abkhazia, Georgia in violation of the rights of returnees." The UN Security Council passed a series of resolutions in which it appealed for a cease-fire.

Background

Prior to the 1992 War, Georgians made up nearly half of Abkhazia's population, while less than one-fifth of the population was Abkhaz. In contrast, in 1926, the two populations had been nearly balanced at around one-third each, with Russians, Armenians, and Greeks constituting the remainder. Large-scale immigration of Georgians, Russians, and Armenians allowed their respective populations to balloon; while the Abkhaz population had not even doubled by 1989, the Georgian population had nearly quadrupled from 67,494 to 239,872, the Armenian population had tripled, and the Russian population had sextupled.

Military conflict in Abkhazia

In 1992, the political situation in Abkhazia changed into a military confrontation between the Georgian government and Abkhaz separatists. The fighting escalated as Georgian Interior and Defence Ministry forces, along with police units, took Sukhumi and came near the city of Gudauta. The ethnically based policies initiated by the Georgians in Sukhumi simultaneously created refugees and a core of fighters determined to regain lost homes. However, as the war progressed, the Abkhaz separatists carried out similar policies of violent displacement of ethnic Georgians in greater proportions, which saw 250,000 people forcefully evicted from their homes. Using aid allegedly provided by Russia, the separatists managed to re-arm and organize militants from North Caucasus. According to political analyst Georgy Mirsky, the Russian military base in Gudauta was, "supplying the Abkhazian side with weapons and ammunition." Furthermore, he adds that "no direct proof of this has ever been offered, but it would be more naïve to believe that the tanks, rockets, howitzers, pieces of ordnance, and other heavy weapons that the anti-Georgian coalition forces were increasing using in their war had been captured from the enemy." This anti-Georgian military coalition was made up of the North Caucasian Group called "The Confederates of Mountain People of Caucasus", Shamil Basaev's "Grey Wolf" Chechen division, the Armenian Bagramian Battalion, Cossacks, militants from Transnistria, and various Russian special units. According to political scientist Bruno Coppieters, "Western governments took some diplomatic initiatives in the United Nations and made up an appeal to Moscow to halt an active involvement of its military forces in the conflict. UN Security Council passed series of resolutions in which it appeals for a cease-fire and condemned the Abkhazian policy of ethnic-cleansing."

Ethnic cleansing (1992–1993)
Confronted with hundreds of thousands of ethnic Georgians unwilling to leave their homes, the Abkhaz side implemented a process of ethnic cleansing to expel and eliminate the ethnic Georgian population in Abkhazia.

The exact number of those killed during the ethnic cleansing is disputed. According to Georgian data, 5,000 civilians were killed and 400 were missing. Roughly 200,000 to 250,000 ethnic Georgians were expelled from their homes. The campaign of ethnic cleansing also affected Russians, Armenians, Greeks, some Abkhaz, and other minor ethnic groups living in Abkhazia. More than 20,000 houses owned by ethnic Georgians were destroyed. Hundreds of schools, kindergartens, churches, hospitals, and historical monuments were pillaged and destroyed.

The 1994 U.S. State Department Country Report describes scenes of massive human rights abuse, which is supported by the findings of Human Rights Watch. According to U.S. State Department Country Report on Conflict in Abkhazia (Georgia):

After the end of the war, the government of Georgia, the United Nations, the Organization for Security and Co-operation in Europe (OSCE), and the refugees began to investigate and gather facts about the allegations of genocide, ethnic cleansing, and deportation conducted by the Abkhaz side during the conflict.
In 1994 and again in 1996, the OSCE, during its Budapest summit, officially recognized the ethnic cleansing of Georgians in Abkhazia and condemned the "perpetrators of war crimes committed during the conflict."

According to Catherine Dale from United Nations High Commissioner for Refugees:

The Human Rights Watch report drafted in 1995 included a detailed account of the war crimes and atrocities committed during the war. It concludes that "Human Rights Watch finds Abkhaz forces responsible for the foreseeable wave of revenge, human rights abuse, and war crimes that were unleashed on the Georgian population in Sukhumi and other parts of Abkhazia. In Human Rights Watch's judgment, these practices were indeed encouraged in order to drive the Georgian population from its homes."

Below are a few examples taken from the Helsinki Human Rights Watch Reports, as well as documentation submitted for review to the United Nations and the Hague War Crimes Tribunal.

Fall of Gagra

On September 3, 1992, the Russian-mediated agreement was signed between Georgian and Abkhaz separatist sides, which obliged Georgia to withdraw its military forces from the city of Gagra. The agreement forced Abkhaz separatists from Gudauta to hold their attacks on the city. Soon after, the Georgian forces, which included Shavnabada, Avaza, and White Eagle battalions (along with their tanks and heavy artillery), left the city. Only small pockets of armed groups (made up of volunteer units of the ethnic Georgians of Gagra) remained. However, on October 1, the Abkhaz side violated the agreement and launched a full-scale attack on Gagra. The attack was well coordinated and mainly carried out by the Chechen (under the command of Shamil Basaev) and North Caucasian militants. Meantime in Gagra, small Georgian detachments lost control of the city suburbs (Leselidze and Kolkhida) and were destroyed in the city center by the end of October 1. With the fall of Gagra, the Georgian population was captured by the separatists and their allies. The first significant massacres and ethnic cleansings were committed during the fall of Gagra.

People of all ages were rounded up from Gagra, Leselidze, and Kolkhida and killed. When the separatist militants entered the city, civilians became a target of mass murder. The main targets were young people and children. According to the witness account: 
"When I returned home I was surprised to see a lot of armed people on the street. They were quiet. I mistook one of them for my Georgian neighbour, and I said, "How are you?" in Georgian. He grabbed me by the wrist and said, "Keep quiet." I wasn't afraid for myself; I thought they had killed my family. He asked me in Russian, "Where are your young people? We won't kill you, we'll kill them." I said they weren't here, that there were only old people left."
Women and young girls captured by the militants became the victims of rape and torture. One elderly Georgian woman who lived through the October attack in Gagra recounted the following: "They brought over a blind man and his brother, who always stayed with him. They began to beat the blind man, his brother and his wife with a gun butt, calling him "dog!" and kicking him. He fell over. I saw blood. One soldier said: "We won't kill you, but where are the young girls?" I said there weren't any."

"My husband Sergo was dragged and tied to a tree. An Abkhaz woman named Zoya Tsvizba brought a tray with lots of salt on it. She took the knife and started to inflict wounds on my husband. After that, she threw salt onto my husband's exposed wounds. They tortured him like that for ten minutes. Afterwards, they forced a young Georgian boy (they killed him afterwards) to dig a hole with the tractor. They placed my husband in this hole and buried him alive. The only thing I remember him saying before he was covered with the gravel and sand was: 'Dali, take care of the kids!'"

After the fall of Gagra, the victors began to pillage, rape, and torture, followed by summary executions of everyone who was captured and failed to flee the city in time. At 5:00 pm on October 1, approximately 1000–1500 civilians were rounded up and placed under guard at the soccer stadium in downtown Gagra. On October 6, close to 50 civilians were found hanging on electricity poles. Soon after, children, elderly, women, and men who were detained at the soccer stadium were gunned down and dumped in mass graves not far from the stadium.

A Russian military observer Mikhail Demianov (who was accused by the Georgian side of being the military advisor to the separatist leader Ardzinba) told Human Rights Watch:

UN observers started to investigate and gather all the facts concerning the war crimes during the fall of Gagra. The Deputy Chairman of the Supreme Council of Abkhazia, Mikhail Jinjaradze, was dragged out of his office and executed.

Massacre in Kamani

After the failed attempt of the separatist forces and their allies to storm Sukhumi on March 14, 1993, they diverted their main forces to the northern side of the front line, which divided Georgian-held Sukhumi and separatist-controlled territories. On July 4, the Confederation of Mountain Peoples of the Caucasus (CMPC) militia, Abkhaz formations, and the Armenian Bagramyan battalion, transported by allegedly Russian naval forces to Tkvarcheli, began their offensive on the northern Sukhumi district. Georgian forces and local volunteer units (including Ukrainian nationalist organization members (UNA-UNSO)) stationed in the villages of Shroma, Tamishi, and Kamani were taken by surprise. On July 5, after intensive fighting, the Georgians lost as many as 500 people in a couple of hours. The village of Kamani fell into the hands of separatist formations and their North Caucasian allies. Kamani was populated mainly by Svans (a sub-ethnic group of the Georgian people) and Orthodox nuns who had been living in the church of St George in the center of the village. The local villagers (including women and children) were massacred, while the church of St George became the scene of a blood bath. The nuns were raped and killed before the Orthodox priests, father Yuri Anua and father Andria. Both priests were taken outside of the church and questioned about the land ownership in Abkhazia. After answering that Abkhazia was neither Georgian nor Abkhaz land but God's, they were shot by a confederate soldier. Another priest, an ethnic Abkhaz who was forced to shoot father Andria, was killed. Approximately 120 inhabitants of the village were massacred.

Fall of Sukhumi

Thomas Goltz, a war correspondent who visited Abkhazia during the war, recalls that Russian MIG-29s dropped 500 kilograms of vacuum bombs which mainly targeted the residential areas of Sukhumi and villages on Gumista River. The Russian journalist Dmitry Kholodov remained in Sukhumi before it fell to separatists and wrote a couple of reports from the besieged city,

On July 27, 1993, a Russian-brokered trilateral agreement on a ceasefire and principles for resolving the Georgian-Abkhazian conflict was signed.  Once again the Georgian military started to withdraw all of its heavy artillery, tanks, and many of its troops from Sukhumi. The Abkhaz separatists and their allies were bound by the agreement to hold their offensive and heavy bombardment of the city. In return, the Georgian side was reassured by Russia that Sukhumi would not be attacked or bombed if the Georgian army completed its withdrawal. The Georgian troops and tanks were evacuated by Russian military ships to the city of Poti. Sukhumi was left without any significant military defense. Many civilians stayed in Sukhumi, and all schools were re-opened on September 1. Many IDPs returned to their homes, and normal life resumed in the city. According to Shevardnadze, he trusted Yeltsin and the Russian guarantees and, therefore, asked the population to return. However, the Abkhaz separatists, North Caucasian Volunteers, Cossacks, and Russian special forces attacked Sukhumi on September 16 at 8 a.m.

The attack marked the beginning of 12 days of non-stop fighting around the besieged Sukhumi, with intensive fighting and human loss from both sides. Georgians who stayed in the city with only rifles and AK-47s were left without any defense from artillery or mechanized units. The union of theater actors of Sukhumi joined the fighting, along with other civilians. The city was mercilessly bombed by Russian air forces and separatist artillery. On September 27, the city fell when Abkhaz, CMPC, and Russian units stormed the House of the Government of Abkhazia. One of the most horrific massacres of this war was waged on the civilian population of Sukhumi after its downfall. During the storming of the city, close to 1,000 people perished as Abkhaz formations overran the streets of the city.  The civilians trapped in the city were taken from their houses, basements, and apartment buildings. In Tamaz Nadareishvili's book Genocide in Abkhazia, the eyewitness interviews of the IDPs include the following account by the elderly Georgian refugee who survived the war:

The separatists and their allies captured the Chairman of the Supreme Council Zhiuli Shartava, the Mayor of Sukhumi Guram Gabiskiria, Mamia Alasania and other members of the Abkhaz government, including the members of Sukhumi police. Initially, they were promised safety, but eventually killed; Shartava was tortured before his death.
A Georgian woman who survived the Sukhumi massacre recalls her ordeal in an interview with Russian film director Andrei Nekrasov:

According to the findings of a Georgian committee, the massacres continued for about two weeks after the fall of Sukhumi; Georgians who had failed to flee the city were hiding in abandoned apartment buildings and house basements; neither combatants nor civilians nor medical personnel (most of them female) was spared. Upon discovery by the militants, they were killed on the spot. One of the most brutal massacres of the war occurred during this period. Video materials show a 5-year-old child being brutally killed by an Abkhaz militant in front of his mother on the streets of Sukhumi.

Over 100 Georgian people working in the cultural field were killed, among them women. Among others were Nato Milorava, the artistic director of the Gumista recreation centre, Vasily Cheidze, Teymuraz Zhvaniya, and Guram Gelovani, actors of the Drama Theatre, and Yuriy Davitaya, the director of the Sukhumi park of culture and recreation.

Also murdered were 200 teachers, including 60 women. Massive reprisals occurred in the neighbouring regions as well. In Khypsta/Akhalsopeli 17 Georgians were shot, the heart of a 70-year-old man was cut out, another man was hacked to death by an axe, and a 65-year-old was tied to a tractor, tortured, and then killed.

Abkhaz nationals were also targeted during the Sukhumi massacres. Anyone who had tried to hide a Georgian refugee or helped in any way was condemned and killed. "Temur Kutarba, an Abhazian, was killed by an Adighe Soldier in front of his children, for not being active in killing Georgians.  V. Vadakaria, 23 and his Abhazian friend, who tried to defend him, both were killed."

Ochamchire
Approximately 400 Georgian families were killed during the Abkhaz offensive on Ochamchire. Similar to the Gagra events of 1992, the local inhabitants were driven to the city soccer stadium Akhaldaba. Men, women, and children were separated from each other. Within hours, the men were executed while women and teenagers were raped and later killed. According to witness accounts, Abkhaz separatists organized detention camps where teenage girls and women were kept for 25 days. During this period they were systematically raped and abused. Along with the atrocities being committed against civilians, more than 50 Georgian prisoners of war were executed. The mass killing of civilians also occurred in other parts of the Ochamchire district, mainly in Kochara (heavily populated by ethnic Georgians –  5340 persons according to pre-war estimates). Approximately 235 civilians were killed and 1000 houses were destroyed.

The former resident of Ochamchire, Leila Goletiani, who was taken prisoner by Abkhaz separatists, gave the following account of her captivity to Andrei Nekrasov:

Gali
After the fall of Sukhumi, the only region in Abkhazia which maintained its large ethnic Georgian population was Gali. The ethnic composition of Gali differed from that of the rest of Abkhazia. The region was mainly populated by ethnic Georgians and had never experienced military activity during the war. At the beginning of 1994, Abkhaz separatists, confronted by the reality of the large ethnic Georgian presence within the borders of Abkhazia, continued their policy of ethnic cleansing and forced expulsion of ethnic Georgians. United Nations observers witnessed the events of 1994 as they unfolded. Between February 8 and 13, the Abkhaz separatist militia and their allies attacked the villages and populated areas of the Gali region, killing, raping, and destroying houses. Approximately 4,200 houses were destroyed as a result. Despite the presence of Russian CIS peacekeeping forces, the massacres of ethnic Georgians were carried out between 1995 and 1996, which resulted in 450 deaths and thousands of IDPs fleeing eastwards.

Post-war period

The legacy of ethnic cleansing in Abkhazia has been devastating for Georgian society. The war and the subsequent systematic ethnic cleansing produced about 200,000-250,000 IDPs, who fled to various Georgian regions, mostly in Samegrelo (Mingrelia) (112,208; UNHCR, June 2000). In Tbilisi and elsewhere in Georgia refugees occupied hundreds of hotels, dormitories and abandoned Soviet military barracks for temporary residency. Many of them had to leave for other countries, primarily to Russia, to search for work.

In the early 1990s, refugees living in Georgia resisted assimilation into Georgian society. Georgia's government did not encourage the assimilation of the refugees, fearing that it would "lose one of the arguments for retaining hegemony over Abkhazia".

Some 60,000 Georgian refugees spontaneously returned to Abkhazia's Gali district between 1994 and 1998, but tens of thousands were displaced again when fighting resumed in the Gali district in 1998. Nevertheless, between 40,000 and 60,000 refugees have returned to the Gali district since 1998, including persons commuting daily across the ceasefire line, as well as those migrating seasonally in accordance with agricultural cycles. The human rights situation remains precarious in Georgian-populated areas of the Gali district. The United Nations and other international organizations have been fruitlessly urging the de facto Abkhaz authorities "to refrain from adopting measures incompatible with the right to return and with international human rights standards, such as discriminatory legislation ... [and] to cooperate in the establishment of a permanent international human rights office in Gali and to admit United Nations civilian police without further delay."

See also

United Nations resolutions on Abkhazia
Georgian Civil War
History of Georgia
Ethnic cleansing of Georgians in South Ossetia
Operation Golden Fleece

Notes

Bibliography
 Mirsky, Georgiy. On Ruins of Empire: Ethnicity and Nationalism in the Former Soviet Union. MacArthur Foundation and the London School of Economics and Political Science.
 Chervonnaia, Svetlana Mikhailovna. Conflict in the Caucasus: Georgia, Abkhazia, and the Russian Shadow. Gothic Image Publications, 1994.
 Human Rights Watch. "Georgia/Abkhazia: Violations of the Laws of War and Russia's Role in the Conflict." Published on hrw.org, March 1995.
 Lynch, Dov.  The Conflict in Abkhazia: Dilemmas in Russian 'Peacekeeping' Policy. Royal Institute of International Affairs, February 1998.
 Marshania L. Tragedy of Abkhazia Moscow, 1996
 White Book of Abkhazia. 1992–1993 Documents, Materials, Evidences. Moscow, 1993.

External links

List of murdered Georgians by districts and villages during the ethnic cleansing in Abkhazia 
Violations of the laws of war and Russia's role in the conflict, Human Rights Watch report
Documented accounts of ethnic cleansing of Georgians in Abkhazia 
Video file, capture of Zhuili Shartava, Guram Gabiskiria, Raul Eshba, etc and their execution (right-click to open file)
Video file, ethnic cleansing of Georgians in Abkhazia
Government of Abkhazia (-in-exile)
Exile Images - Thomas Morley: The forgotten refugees of Abkhazia
Report of the Secretary-General's fact-finding mission to investigate human rights violations in Abkhazia, Republic of Georgia

1992 in Abkhazia
1993 in Abkhazia
1990s murders in Georgia (country)
1992 crimes in Georgia (country)
1993 crimes in Georgia (country)
Georgia
Georgia
Abkhaz–Georgian conflict
Anti-Georgian sentiment
Citation overkill
 
Human rights abuses in Georgia (country)
Massacres in Georgia (country)
Persecution of Greeks in Europe
Politics of Georgia (country)
War crimes in Georgia (country)